Fly Girls is an American reality television series that follows the personal lives of five flight attendants working for Virgin America.

The first and only season of Fly Girls consisted of 8 episodes. It premiered on March 24, 2010 and finished May 5, 2010.

Overview

Background 
The show was picked up by The CW on September 23, 2009 for eight half-hour episodes. The show followed the cast as they fly to a range of locations including Las Vegas, South Beach and New York City while also focusing on their home life, at their "crash-pad" in Los Angeles. The show is produced by Collins Avenue Productions, with executive producers Jeff Collins and Colin Nash along with co-executive producers Bradley Bredeweg and Peter Paige.

Starring 
Louise Nguyen
Farrah Williams - Flight Attendant for Virgin America since its inaugural flight.
Tasha Dunnigan
Mandalay Roberts
Nikole Rubyn
Rachel Moore- Australian Flight Attendant (seen on 'The Bachelor Australia' in 2015)

Cancellation 
On May 20, 2010 The CW canceled the series of Fly Girls after one season.

Episodes

References

External links 
 

2010 American television series debuts
2010s American reality television series
2010 American television series endings
The CW original programming
English-language television shows
Aviation television series
Television shows set in Los Angeles
Television series about flight attendants
Virgin Group